The Third Division Football Tournament for the 2010 season in the Maldives played with 35 teams.

Semi final

Final

References

External links
 6 teams qualified for quarters Haveeru Online (DHIVEHI)

Maldivian Third Division Football Tournament seasons
3